The Elfkins – Baking a Difference, also known as A Piece of Cake is a 2019 German computer-animated film directed by Ute von Münchow-Pohl.

The film premiered at the 2019 SCHLINGEL International Film Festival.

Plot

Heinzelmännchen are helping a baker.

References

External links
 

2019 films
2019 computer-animated films
2010s children's animated films
German animated films
German children's films
2010s English-language films
2010s German-language films
Animated films about friendship
Anime-influenced Western animation
Films set in Cologne
2010s German films